How Big, How Blue, How Beautiful is the third studio album by English indie rock band Florence and the Machine, released on 29 May 2015 by Island Records. After returning from her year-long hiatus from music, lead vocalist Florence Welch returned to configure How Big, How Blue, How Beautiful, recording material that dealt with personal conflicts and struggles. In comparison to their last two studio albums, the album is much more refined and stripped-down instrumentally, and incorporates a mixture of musical influences such as folk, blues and gospel.

How Big, How Blue, How Beautiful was met with positive reviews from music critics, who commended the album for its cohesion, production and Welch's vocal delivery. Additionally, it appeared on several year-end critics' lists. The album debuted at number one on the UK Albums Chart with 68,788 copies sold in its first week, becoming the band's third consecutive number-one album. Four singles were released from the album, "What Kind of Man", "Ship to Wreck", "Queen of Peace" and "Delilah". The album earned the band five Grammy Award nominations, in addition to being shortlisted for the 2015 Mercury Prize.

Background
In 2011, Florence and the Machine released their second studio album, Ceremonials, which became their second consecutive effort to peak at number one on the UK Albums Chart, as well as their first to reach the top 10 of the US Billboard 200, peaking at number six. The album included the song "Spectrum (Say My Name)", which was remixed by Scottish musician Calvin Harris and became the group's first number-one single on the UK Singles Chart in July 2012. In late August 2012, the band's lead vocalist Florence Welch revealed to Style.com that she would take a year-long hiatus from music, explaining, "There's a big 'take a year off' plan. The record company have put no pressure on me for the next album. They've said I can have as long as I want". During her break, Welch made a guest appearance on Calvin Harris's album 18 Months, providing vocals on the song "Sweet Nothing", which topped the UK chart.

Conception and recording
In an interview with Zane Lowe on 16 February 2015, Welch said that during the year off she had "a bit of a nervous breakdown", and that time was chaotic. The hiatus was somewhat new for the singer, who was almost constantly at work during the making of the band's first two albums. Welch explained further, saying, "I was still going out and going to events but something wasn't quite right, I was spiraling a bit. I wasn't making myself happy. I wasn't stable." It allowed Welch to reassess her musical approach to reflect her own life experiences, a change she credits to consulting with Taylor Swift. Overall, the recording sessions for How Big, How Blue, How Beautiful were conducted during a vulnerable period in Welch's life, making the album her most personal work thus far.

Welch began composing the material for How Big, How Blue, How Beautiful upon concluding the band's touring in support of Ceremonials, in 2014. Regarding the album's themes, she said in a press statement, "I guess although I've always dealt in fantasy and metaphor when I came to writing, that meant the songs this time were dealing much more in reality. Ceremonials was so fixated on death and water, and the idea of escape or transcendence through death, but the new album became about trying to learn how to live, and how to love in the world rather than trying to escape from it. Which is frightening because I'm not hiding behind anything but it felt like something I had to do." Welch also told Lowe that producer Markus Dravs was instrumental in exploring her lyrical versatility, as he disallowed her to write any more songs about water, a main theme in Welch's past compositions. Still, she managed to pen "Ship to Wreck", a song Welch jokingly commented was "not too explicit" in comparison to her past works.

On 4 June 2014, Welch told NME that the band's third studio album was in the works. There was an emphasized effort to avoid heavily orchestrating the instrumental arrangements, or as Welch described it, "make Ceremonials Part Two", as she believed the predecessor had reached its creative peak. Welch said that she wanted to work with Dravs on the album, as he produced Björk's Homogenic (1997), an important album to Welch. "I felt he had that balance of organic and electronic capabilities, managing those two worlds. And, you know, he's good with big sounds. And I like big sounds. And he's good with trumpets, and I knew I wanted a brass section on this record", she said in the press release. "With Markus, I wanted to make something that was big but that had a gentleness to it, that had a warmth, that was rooted. I think that's why we went back more to the live instruments. Something that was band-led almost", she added. The final track on the album, "Mother", was co-produced by Dravs and Paul Epworth.

Promotion

On 10 February 2015, Florence and the Machine released a music video featuring a snippet of the album's title track, "How Big, How Blue, How Beautiful". The video, which showed Welch dancing with her look-alike, was directed by Tabitha Denholm and Vincent Haycock, and served as an album teaser.

Florence and the Machine performed "What Kind of Man" and "Ship to Wreck" on Later... with Jools Holland on 28 April 2015. On 9 May, the band performed both songs on Saturday Night Live. The group performed "Ship to Wreck" on The Tonight Show Starring Jimmy Fallon on June 2.

The band performed at numerous European festivals in summer 2015, including Way Out West in Sweden, headlining Glastonbury festival, Super Bock Super Rock in Portugal and Rock Werchter in Belgium, among others. On 9 September 2015, the group's tour in support of the album kicked off in Belfast, Northern Ireland.

The Odyssey
Starting on 12 February 2015, the band released a series of Vincent Haycock-directed music videos for several songs from the album, with each video acting as a chapter in a story titled The Odyssey. The complete 47-minute short film premiered via the band's website on 25 April 2016, consisting of all previously released videos, as well as new connecting scenes and a new final chapter, set to "Third Eye". Haycock explained that The Odyssey follows "Florence's personal journey to find herself again after the emotional storm of a heartbreak. Like the layers of Dante's purgatory, each song or chapter represents a battle that Florence traversed and physical landscape that embodied each song or story."

 Chapter 1: "What Kind of Man"
 Chapter 2: "How Big, How Blue, How Beautiful" 
 Chapter 3: "St. Jude"
 Chapter 4: "Ship to Wreck"
 Chapter 5: "Queen of Peace"
 Chapter 6: "Long & Lost"
 Chapter 7: "Mother" 
 Chapter 8: "Delilah"
 Chapter 9: "Third Eye"
 Credits: "Various Storms & Saints"

Singles
"What Kind of Man" was released as the lead single from the album two days after the "How Big, How Blue, How Beautiful" teaser. The song was premiered on BBC Radio 1 on 12 February 2015 at 7:30 p.m. local time along with an announcement of the album's release date, title and track listing. The music video, directed by Vincent Haycock and choreographed by Ryan Heffington, premiered online shortly afterwards, along with the album's pre-order. The single reached number 37 on the UK Singles Chart and number 88 on the US Billboard Hot 100. On 18 April 2015, "What Kind of Man" was issued as a limited-edition 12-inch vinyl for Record Store Day, featuring "As Far as I Could Get" as its B-side.

"Ship to Wreck" was released as the second single on 9 April 2015. The music video for the song, also shot by Haycock, choreographed by Heffington and filmed in Welch's own house, was released on 13 April. The track peaked at number 27 on the UK chart.

"Queen of Peace" was released as the third single on 4 September 2015. The music video was issued prior to the single on 27 July 2015 as a 10-minute double-feature, including the song "Long and Lost", and was filmed on the Scottish island of Easdale.

"Delilah" was released as the fourth and final single from the album on 27 November 2015. The track premiered as a Hottest Record on Annie Mac's BBC Radio 1 show on 19 May 2015, and its accompanying music video premiered on 21 October. The song, along with its demo version, was released as a limited-edition 12-inch vinyl for Record Store Day on 16 April 2016, including a cover of Neil Young's "Only Love Can Break Your Heart" as its B-side.

Other songs
A music video for "St. Jude" premiered on 23 March 2015. Considered to be a continuation of the video for "What Kind of Man", it was also directed by Haycock and choreographed by Heffington and sees Florence Welch "traveling through their version of the Divine Comedy."

Critical reception

How Big, How Blue, How Beautiful received positive reviews from critics. At Metacritic, which assigns a weighted mean rating out of 100 to reviews from mainstream critics, the album received an average score of 77, based on 31 reviews. Kyle Anderson of Entertainment Weekly viewed How Big, How Blue, How Beautiful as "Florence + the Machine's most raw and stripped-down album to date", adding that "Welch may have gone slightly smaller with her sound, but her emotional depth and capacity for wonder remain gigantic." Michael Madden of Consequence of Sound hailed it as "the strongest Florence album to date" due to Welch having "reached a new level of eloquence in her writing, making her a more complete artist than ever", concluding that "it's apparent she's among her generation's most deserving superstars, maintaining a stunning balance of technical mastery and sensitive lyricism." Leonie Cooper of NME wrote, "Overflowing with stately songwriting and lyrical craftsmanship, How Big, How Blue, How Beautiful makes for a restrained but joyful return, and a collection that will last long after Welch's broken bones are mended." Carl Wilson of Billboard commented, "No matter the mood and tempo, though, the Florence & The Machine heard on How Big How Blue How Beautiful is a newly self-aware one. It shows a different kind of mastery by allowing for a different kind of vulnerability, an especially delicate balancing act for a young woman in pop music." Q hailed the band's thematic development, noting a "more righteous indignation" in the album's lyrics. In a four out of five star review, the New York Daily News observed that "[t]he songs have a canny way of avoiding genre cliches" and artistically, Welch "draws more from the new wave of Siouxsie and the Banshees or the pan-pop breadth of Annie Lennox's solo career".

Helen Brown of The Daily Telegraph praised the album as "thunderous" and stated that Welch "has turned her turmoil into a powerful record, adding a new spiritual depth and mature awareness to the thrill of the wild emotions she has always been able to pump so fearlessly out of her mighty heart and lungs." Douglas Wolk of Pitchfork described the album as "a huge, sturdy record, built for arenas [...] and it's richly and carefully enough constructed to endure the extensive exposure Welch's heartache is going to get over the course of this summer." Will Hermes of Rolling Stone opined that "Welch isn't the most rhythmic singer; she's more about powerful held notes and dramatic articulation, and her rock moves have sometimes felt fussy in the past. But here, she punches like a prizefighter." James Christopher Monger of AllMusic expressed that Welch's "Brit-pop soul treacle is still miles better than some of her contemporaries' top-tier offerings, and when the album connects it moves right in and starts to redecorate, but when it falters, it's akin to a chatty party guest failing to realize that everyone else has gone home." In a less enthusiastic review, Andrew Unterberger of Spin dubbed the album "an exceedingly coherent listen, both in terms of consistent production and lyrical themes [...] But it's not a great album, and that's because the production and dynamics are so compressed to soupy church-soul consistency that once you get into the thick of the LP, it's virtually impossible to keep your attention rapt throughout." Alexis Petridis of The Guardian felt that the album is "too overblown and daft for the songs to have the desired emotional impact: it's never really intimate enough for the feelings Welch expresses to connect."

Accolades
How Big, How Blue, How Beautiful was shortlisted for the 2015 Mercury Prize. It also received five nominations at the 2016 Grammy Awards, including Best Pop Vocal Album and Best Recording Package for the album, Best Rock Song and Best Rock Performance for "What Kind of Man", and Best Pop Duo/Group Performance for "Ship to Wreck". The Odyssey was nominated for Breakthrough Long Form Video at the 2016 MTV Video Music Awards. The albums was also ranked at number 68 on the list of the 100 Best Albums of the 2010s by Rolling Stone.

Commercial performance
How Big, How Blue, How Beautiful debuted at number one on the UK Albums Chart with first-week sales of 68,788 copies, earning the band their third consecutive number-one album. The album slipped to number two for two weeks in a row, before reclaiming the number-one spot in its fourth week on the chart, with 14,419 copies sold. In the United States, the album debuted atop the Billboard 200 with 137,000 album-equivalent units, of which 128,000 were pure album sales. It marked the band's first number-one album on the chart, as well as their largest sales week. As of December 2015, How Big, How Blue, How Beautiful had sold 290,000 copies in the US. The album debuted at number one on the Canadian Albums Chart, selling 19,000 copies in its first week. In Australia, the album debuted at the top of the charts, with sales of 15,706 copies.

Elsewhere, How Big, How Blue, How Beautiful topped the charts in Ireland, New Zealand, Poland and Switzerland, while reaching the top five in Austria, Belgium, Denmark, Germany, the Netherlands, Norway, Portugal and Spain, and the top 10 in Finland, Greece, Italy and Sweden. As of February 2016, the album had sold one million copies worldwide.

Track listing

Notes
  signifies a co-producer

Personnel
Credits adapted from the liner notes of the deluxe edition of How Big, How Blue, How Beautiful.

Florence and the Machine

 Florence Welch – vocals ; backing vocals ; body percussion ; stamps, claps ; piano, percussion 
 Chris Hayden – drums ; percussion 
 Rob Ackroyd – electric guitar ; acoustic guitar ; ukulele 
 Mark Saunders – bass 
 Isabella Summers – Rhodes organ ; programming, drums, synths, bass, keys ; strings, stamps, claps ; Rhodes, percussion 
 Rusty Bradshaw – piano 
 Tom Monger – harp

Additional musicians

 Kid Harpoon – drums, percussion, bass, CP70 synth ; electric guitar ; brass writing, brass arrangements ; acoustic guitar, piano 
 Leo Abrahams – acoustic guitar ; electric guitar 
 James Hallawell – Hammond organ ; Farfisa, piano, organ 
 Markus Dravs – glockenspiel ; percussion, synths ; bass synth ; programming ; body percussion, electric guitar ; woodwind arrangements 
 Janelle Martin – backing vocals 
 Nim Miller – backing vocals 
 Baby N'Sola – backing vocals 
 John Hill – synths, brass writing, brass arrangements 
 Nigel Black – French horn 
 Pip Eastop – French horn 
 Sam Jacobs – French horn 
 Elise Campbell – French horn 
 John Barclay – trumpet ; piccolo trumpet 
 Philip Cobb – trumpet ; flugel trumpet 
 Andy Crowley – trumpet 
 Tom Rees-Roberts – trumpet 
 Andy Wood – Euphonium ; trombone 
 Ed Tarrant – Euphonium 
 Richard Edwards – tenor trombone 
 Oren Marshall – tuba 
 Steve Jones – electric guitar 
 Robin Baynton – Rhodes organ ; piano ; organ 
 Pete Prokopiw – harp, cimbalom ; programming 
 Will Owen – brass arrangements ; string arrangements 
 Ali Helnwein – brass arrangements, string arrangements ; strings 
 Sally Herbert – orchestration ; conducting ; flute arrangements, brass arrangements, string arrangements ; brass orchestration, brass conducting ; woodwind arrangements 
 Ian Humphries – violin 
 Ian Belton – violin 
 Emlyn Singleton – violin 
 Patrick Kiernan – violin 
 Julia Singleton – violin 
 John Smart – violin 
 Ann Morfee – violin 
 Natalia Bonner – violin 
 Sonia Slany – violin 
 Gillon Cameron – violin 
 Ciaran McCabe – violin 
 Alison Dods – violin 
 Fiona Bonds – viola 
 Ian Rathbone – viola 
 Max Baillie – viola 
 Rachel Robson – viola 
 Ian Burdge – cello 
 Chris Worsey – cello 
 Nick Cooper – cello 
 Sophie Harris – cello 
 Richard Pryce – bass 
 Lucy Shaw – bass 
 Eliza Marshall – flute, alto flute 
 Matt Ingram – drums, percussion 
 Benson – additional keys, programming, flute arrangements, brass arrangements, string arrangements ; backing vocals 
 Daniel Newell – piccolo trumpet, flugel, trumpet 
 Everton Nelson – violin 
 Rick Koster – violin 
 Oli Langford – violin 
 Bruce White – viola 
 Nick Barr – viola 
 Iain Berryman – piano, harmonium, acoustic guitar ; body percussion, cornet 
 James Ford – programming ; woodwind arrangements ; drums, bass, guitar, keys, percussion, piano, synths 
 Rebecca Wood – oboe, cor anglais 
 Pete Harrison – bassoon 
 Paul Epworth – drums, bass, guitar, synths, organ, percussion 
 Orlando Leopard – piano, bass, harmonium, organ, additional arrangement 
 Charlie Hugall – programming, percussion 
 Wayne Francis – saxophone 
 Nick Walters – trumpet 
 Adman Dayes – trombone 
 Brett Shaw – additional percussion 
 Alex Beitzke – guitar

Technical

 Markus Dravs – production 
 Kid Harpoon – production ; co-production 
 Robin Baynton – engineering ; strings recording, brass recording, flute recording ; woodwind recording 
 Jonathan Sagis – engineering assistance 
 Iain Berryman – engineering assistance ; additional engineering 
 Mark "Spike" Stent – mixing 
 Geoff Swan – mixing assistance 
 Ted Jensen – mastering 
 John Hill – co-production 
 Joe Kearns – additional engineering ; engineering 
 Mat Bartram – brass recording ; strings recording ; flute recording ; engineering 
 Ronan Phelan – brass recording assistance ; strings recording assistance ; flute recording assistance 
 Craig Silvey – mixing 
 Eduardo de la Paz – mixing assistance 
 Dan Cox – additional engineering 
 Paul Epworth – production 
 James Ford – production 
 Jimmy Robertson – engineering 
 Charlie Hugall – production, engineering ; mixing 
 Will Donbavand – mixing assistance 
 Isabella "Machine" Summers – production 
 Ben Roulston – engineering 
 Alex Beitzke – engineering 
 John Catlin – mixing assistance 
 Brett Shaw – production, engineering, mixing

Artwork
 Tabitha Denholm – creative direction, insert photography
 Brian Roettinger – art direction
 Tom Beard – cover photography, insert photography
 Vincent Haycock – insert photography

Charts

Weekly charts

Year-end charts

Certifications and sales

Release history

Notes

References

2015 albums
Albums produced by Markus Dravs
Florence and the Machine albums
Visual albums
Island Records albums
Republic Records albums